Dieter Mietz (born 3 September 1943) is a German former footballer who played as a defender. He competed for West Germany in the men's tournament at the 1972 Summer Olympics.

References

External links
 

1943 births
Living people
Sportspeople from Olsztyn
German footballers
Association football defenders
Olympic footballers of West Germany
West German footballers
Footballers at the 1972 Summer Olympics
Bundesliga players
SG Wattenscheid 09 players
Borussia Dortmund players
Sportfreunde Siegen players